Liu Yuan (born 22 February 1951) is a retired General of the Chinese People's Liberation Army and a former politician. He served as the last political commissar of the PLA General Logistics Department and prior to that, political commissar of the PLA Academy of Military Science. Before his military career, he served as vice mayor of Zhengzhou and vice governor of Henan. He is the son of Liu Shaoqi, former President of China.

Life and career
Liu Yuan was born in 1951 in Beijing, the son of Liu Shaoqi, a Communist revolutionary and former President of China, and Wang Guangmei, a multilingual interpreter who also worked for the party. He graduated from the No. 2 Experimental School in Beijing in 1964, and entered a regiment on the Central Security Bureau to undergo military training during his summer vacation.

In 1966, Mao launched the Cultural Revolution, and targeted Liu Shaoqi through the euphemistic "Bombard the Headquarters" big-character poster that Mao penned himself and ordered circulated all over the country. Liu Yuan, perhaps not initially realizing the real target of the poster was his own father, answered Mao's call-to-arms to usher in a brave new world by joining a Red Guard regiment at Beijing No. 4 High School. In September 1967, after his father had been forcibly removed from the capital, Liu Yuan and his two sisters escaped the Zhongnanhai compound by themselves but were left homeless. They found temporary shelter at the No. 4 Middle School.

Liu Shaoqi fell into political disgrace and was later killed during the Cultural Revolution. However, he was later rehabilitated after the Cultural Revolution ended. Liu Yuan was therefore allowed to participate in politics again.

In 1985, Liu Yuan became the vice mayor of Zhengzhou, capital of Henan. He was promoted to vice governor of Henan in 1988. Since 1992, he had served in People's Armed Police for years.  In 2003, he became a deputy political commissar of the PLA General Logistics Department, and was made lieutenant general. He was appointed as political commissar of the PLA Academy of Military Science in 2005. On 20 July 2009, Liu was promoted to general.

In 2010, Liu wrote the preface to a friend's book titled Changing Our View of Culture and History, which has aroused notice for criticizing recent Party leadership and calls for the rejection of foreign models and a return to a supposed upright military heritage.

Wall Street Journalists believe Liu is politically close to other "princelings", especially Xi Jinping, the General Secretary of the Communist Party of China. Xi Jinping was said to be moving to promote Liu to the Central Military Commission after 'accusations (by Liu) in 2012 paved the way for the corruption charges against' senior military offices General Xu Caihou and lieutenant general Gu Junshan, as part of his plan to tackle corruption. Despite media speculation that he would take on the post of the Central Military Commission's new Discipline Inspection Commission, Liu Yuan retired in December 2015. Regarding his retirement, Liu said, "I will be the last political commissar of the Logistics Department... I will absolutely obey the military reforms [of Xi Jinping]."

In 2016, Liu was named deputy chair of the National People's Congress Financial and Economic Affairs Committee.

Liu was a member of the 17th and the 18th Central Committees of the Communist Party of China.

References

Living people
1951 births
Liu Shaoqi family
Children of national leaders of China
People's Republic of China politicians from Beijing
People's Liberation Army generals from Beijing
Chinese Communist Party politicians from Beijing
Political office-holders in Henan
Beijing No. 4 High School alumni